Dilip Mane is a Shiv Sena politician from Solapur district.  He was a member of Maharashtra Legislative Assembly representing Solapur South constituency from 2009 to 2014.

Positions held
 2009: Elected as Member of Maharashtra Legislative Assembly

References

External links
 The Shivsena

Members of the Maharashtra Legislative Assembly
Living people
People from Solapur district
Marathi politicians
Shiv Sena politicians
Year of birth missing (living people)